Nick Mulvey (born 4 November 1984) is an English musician, singer and songwriter. He played the hang as a founding member of the band Portico Quartet. In 2011 he started his career as a singer-songwriter releasing the EPs The Trellis (2012) and Fever to the Form (2013) and his studio album First Mind in 2014 which received a Mercury Music Prize nomination. His second album, Wake Up Now, was released on 8 September 2017.

Beginnings
Mulvey grew up in Cambridge and attended Chesterton Community College and Long Road Sixth Form College. At the age of 19 he moved to Havana, Cuba, to study music and art. On returning to the UK, Mulvey enrolled at the University of London's School of Oriental and African Studies to study Ethnomusicology.

Portico Quartet

While studying ethnomusicology at the School of Oriental and African Studies, Mulvey met the other members of Portico Quartet. The band consisted of Cambridge school friend Duncan Bellamy (drums), Jack Wyllie (soprano and tenor saxophone), and Milo Fitzpatrick (double bass). Their debut album Knee-deep in the North Sea, was nominated for the 2008 Mercury Prize alongside Radiohead, Elbow, and Adele. The album's title was mentioned in the closing words to Alt-J's song Dissolve Me. Portico Quartet released their second album Isla on 9 October 2009 through Real World Records.

Solo career
Mulvey left Portico Quartet in 2011 to focus on a solo career as a singer-songwriter. Some critics noted his change in style, Mulvey states that his style of music stays consistent. "I'm always drawn to the same principles in music. Beneath each genre, at a certain level, they hold the same principles".

As a solo artist, Mulvey released his first EP The Trellis in November 2012, and his second, Fever to the Form in July 2013. On his autumn 2013 tour with Laura Marling, he performed in symphony halls across the UK, naming Marling as a great influence to his solo music.

In 2014, Mulvey played Wonderfruit in Thailand.

On 16 May 2017, Mulvey announced the single "Unconditional", and on 20 May 2017 announced the album Wake Up Now, released on 8 September 2017. Two further singles were released: "Myela" (about the European migrant crisis) and "Mountain to Move".

Discography

Studio albums

Extended plays

Singles

References

External links
 

1984 births
Living people
English male singer-songwriters
Fiction Records artists
21st-century English singers
21st-century British male singers